The Cathedral of the Incarnation, located at 2015 West End Avenue in Nashville, Tennessee, is the cathedral seat of the Roman Catholic Diocese of Nashville. It is named after the mystery of the Incarnation, which celebrates the miraculous conception of Jesus in the womb of the Virgin Mary, by which God became man according to Christian teaching. 

There have been three cathedral churches in Nashville. The first was the Holy Rosary Cathedral which is now demolished and occupied the site of what is now the Tennessee State Capitol.  The second was Saint Mary's Cathedral, which still stands on the corner of Fifth and Church Streets.

Construction of the Cathedral of the Incarnation began in 1910 under the direction of Bishop Thomas Sebastian Byrne. It was completed and dedicated July 26, 1914. The church has undergone three major renovations, one in 1937, another in 1987, and the most recent which began in March 2019. The 1987 renovation was supervised by Father Richard S. Vosko, a liturgical design consultant and priest of the Diocese of Albany who has overseen the redesign and renovation of numerous churches and cathedrals around the country. The 2019 renovation was begun by Father Edward Steiner and is being completed by Father Eric Fowlkes.

The church's architecture is modeled after the traditional Roman basilica, specifically the basilica San Martino ai Monti in Rome. The primary architect was Fred Asmus.

See also
List of Catholic cathedrals in the United States
List of cathedrals in the United States

Sources

External links

Official Cathedral Site
Roman Catholic Diocese of Nashville Official Site

1907 establishments in Tennessee
Cathedral of the Incarnation
Christian organizations established in 1907
Incarnation
Roman Catholic churches completed in 1914
Roman Catholic churches in Tennessee
Roman Catholic Diocese of Nashville
20th-century Roman Catholic church buildings in the United States